"Blue Eyes" is a song performed by English musician Elton John with music and lyrics written by John and Gary Osborne. It was released in 1982, as the UK lead single from John's sixteenth studio album, Jump Up! (1982). It was released as the album's second single in the US. It hit No. 8 in the UK; in the US, it spent three weeks at No. 10 on the Cash Box chart, went to No. 12 on the Billboard Hot 100, and spent two weeks at No. 1 on the Billboard AC chart. John performed this song often in his concerts until 2012.

It was heard in an episode of The Boondocks, during which a character named Tom Dubois sadly reminisces about his wife Sarah.

Music video
The music video for the song was filmed in Australia, on Sydney's famous Bondi to Bronte walk. The exact location is at the most easterly point of Marks Park, Tamarama, where a low, sandstone turret rests on the top of the cliffs and overlooks the Tasman Sea. The white grand piano was positioned right in the middle of the turret. The song and video was in dedication to Elizabeth Taylor.

Personnel
 Elton John – vocals, acoustic piano 
 James Newton Howard – Fender Rhodes, synthesizers, string arrangements and conductor 
 Dee Murray – bass
 Jeff Porcaro – drums, possible tambourine
 The Mountain Fjord Orchestra – strings
 Gavyn Wright – concertmaster

Accolades
Grammy Awards

|-
|  style="width:35px; text-align:center;" rowspan="2"|1983 || rowspan="2"| "Blue Eyes" || Best Pop Vocal Performance – Male || 
|-

Charts

Weekly charts

Year-end charts

See also
 List of number-one adult contemporary singles of 1982 (U.S.)

References

External links
 Lyrics of this song
 

1982 singles
1982 songs
Elton John songs
Songs with music by Elton John
Songs with lyrics by Gary Osborne
Song recordings produced by Chris Thomas (record producer)
Pop ballads
Eye color
Geffen Records singles
The Rocket Record Company singles